"Til My Baby Comes Home" is a song by American recording artist Luther Vandross released in 1985 as the lead single in support of his platinum album The Night I Fell in Love.

Background
Til Baby Comes Home  features an organ solo performed by musician Billy Preston.

Charts
Following its release, Vandross charted five top-five singles when the song peaked to #4 on Billboards Hot R&B Singles chart. The song also became his second top 30 on Billboard's Hot 100.

References

External links
 www.luthervandross.com

1985 songs
Luther Vandross songs
1985 singles
Songs written by Luther Vandross
Songs written by Marcus Miller
Epic Records singles